Baidi (Chinese: 白地; Pinyin: Báidì) is a township in Nagarzê County, Shannan Prefecture, Tibet Autonomous Region of China. The village of Baidi is located in the township.

See also
List of towns and villages in Tibet

Notes

Populated places in Shannan, Tibet
Township-level divisions of Tibet
Nagarzê County